Douglas-Apsley is a national park and a locality on the east coast of Tasmania, Australia, 149 km northeast of Hobart, and a few kilometres north of Bicheno.  It is one of Tasmania's newer National Parks, having been declared on 27 December 1989.

Description
The park preserves remnant east coast dry forested catchment of three main streams, Apsley River, Denison Rivulet and Douglas River.  Highlights include deep gorges, wildflower displays and mild inland climate.  Visitors can undertake short walks or do a three-day trek.

Birds
The park has been identified by BirdLife International as an Important Bird Area because it supports 11 of Tasmania's endemic bird species as well as flame and pink robins and, probably, swift parrots.

See also
 Protected areas of Tasmania

References

External links
 
 Douglas Apsley

National parks of Tasmania
Important Bird Areas of Tasmania
1989 establishments in Australia